Bala Now Deh (also Romanized as Bālā Now Deh; also known as Naudeh and Now Deh) is a village in Bibalan Rural District, Kelachay District, Rudsar County, Gilan Province, Iran. At the 2006 census, its population was 686, in 200 families.

References 

Populated places in Rudsar County